Kluet River is a river in the province of Aceh, in northern Sumatra, Indonesia, about 1500 km northwest of the capital Jakarta.

Geography
The river flows in the northern area of Sumatra with predominantly tropical rainforest climate (designated as Af in the Köppen-Geiger climate classification). The annual average temperature in the area is 23 °C. The warmest month is February, when the average temperature is around 24 °C, and the coldest is July, at 21 °C. The average annual rainfall is 3153 mm. The wettest month is December, with an average of 381 mm rainfall, and the driest is June, with 126 mm rainfall.

See also
List of rivers of Indonesia
List of rivers of Sumatra

References

Rivers of Aceh
Rivers of Indonesia